Wake the Sleeping Dragon! is the twelfth full-length album by American hardcore punk band Sick of It All. It was released on November 2, 2018 by Fat Wreck Chords in the United States (on CD and viny) and in Canada (on vinyl) and by Century Media Records in Europe (both on CD and vinyl). Wake the Sleeping Dragon! is the band's first release on Fat Wreck Chords in 15 years.

Background 
The album was announced by Sick of It All in August 2018. The first song of the upcoming album, "Inner Vision", was released the same month. A second song, the title track "Wake the Sleeping Dragon", was released in October 2018. A lyric video for this song was released a few days later. A day after the official release of Wake the Sleeping Dragon!, a music video for "That Crazy White Boy Shit" was released. A music video for "Self Important Shithead" was released in July 2019.

Track listing 
 "Inner Vision" - 1:54
 "That Crazy White Boy Shit" - 2:05
 "The Snake (Break Free)" - 1:58
 "Bull's Anthem" - 2:02
 "Robert Moses Was a Racist" - 1:29
 "Self Important Shithead" - 0:58
 "To the Wolves" - 1:40
 "Always with Us" - 2:26
 "Wake the Sleeping Dragon" - 2:02
 "2+2" - 1:49
 "Beef Between Vegans" - 2:12
 "Hardcore Horseshoe" - 1:53
 "Mental Furlough" - 2:17
 "Deep State" - 1:53
 "Bad Hombres" - 2:01
 "Work the System" - 1:46
 "The New Slavery" - 2:39

Performers 
 Lou Koller – vocals
 Pete Koller – guitars
 Craig Setari – bass
 Armand Majidi – drums

Charts

References 

2018 albums
Sick of It All albums
Century Media Records albums
Fat Wreck Chords albums